Senokos (Greek: Σενοκός) is a village in Simitli Municipality, in Blagoevgrad Province, in southwestern Bulgaria.

Senokos Nunatak on Trinity Peninsula in Antarctica is named after the village.

References

Villages in Blagoevgrad Province